Cyril Lemoine (born 3 March 1983) is a French former professional road bicycle racer, who competed as a professional from 2005 to 2022.

Career
Born in Tours, Lemoine joined  for the 2014 season, after his previous team –  – folded at the end of the 2013 season.

In June 2021, Lemoine was forced to abandon the 2021 Tour de France, after being involved in a crash on the opening stage, suffering broken ribs and a collapsed lung.

Major results

2003
 3rd Paris–Mantes-en-Yvelines
2004
 1st Stage 3 Tour du Tarn-et-Garonne
 2nd Overall Boucles de la Mayenne
2006
 8th Overall Tour de Luxembourg
1st  Young rider classification
2009
 3rd Overall Four Days of Dunkirk
 3rd Grote Prijs Stad Zottegem
 4th Châteauroux Classic
 5th Overall Critérium International
2010
 7th Tro-Bro Léon
 10th Overall Tour of Belgium
2011
 9th Grand Prix de Fourmies
 10th Overall Three Days of De Panne
 10th Paris–Brussels
2012
 5th Overall Paris–Corrèze
 7th Overall Circuit de Lorraine
 7th Châteauroux Classic
 8th Overall Boucles de la Mayenne
1st  Points classification
2013
 5th La Roue Tourangelle
 6th Tro-Bro Léon
 9th Paris–Bourges
2014
 3rd Overall Tour du Poitou-Charentes
 6th Overall Tour of Belgium
 10th Paris–Bourges
 Tour de France
Held  after Stages 2–7
2015
 7th Dwars door Vlaanderen
2019
 10th Primus Classic
2021
 10th Bredene Koksijde Classic

Grand Tour general classification results timeline

References

External links 
Profile at Crédit Agricole official website 

French male cyclists
1983 births
Living people
Sportspeople from Tours, France
Cyclists from Centre-Val de Loire